I Still Hide to Smoke is a 2016 French-Greek-Algerian drama film directed by Rayhana Obermeyer. The film premiered at the 2016 Tallinn Black Nights Film Festival.

Plot 
Fatima is a strong-willed woman who works as a masseuse in a hamam in Algiers. The year is 1995, and the situation in the capital is tense, as laws are being passed limiting women's freedoms. But the hammam is a safe place to roll a cigarette or talk, away from the eyes of men. Women from different backgrounds gather there, and talk about their lives.

On her way to work one day, Fatima witnesses a terror attack. In the hamam, rather than feeling safe, the atmosphere is electric and she finds it difficult to maintain order. The situation deteriorates when Meriem arrives at the hamam. Meriem is 16 years old and pregnant, and seeking refuge. Shortly thereafter, her brother Muhammad arrives, to "cleanse" his honor with blood.

Cast 
 Hiam Abbass as Fatima
 Biyouna as Aïcha
 Fadila Belkebla as Samia
 Nassima Benchicou as Zahia
 Nadia Kaci as Keltoum
 Sarah Layssac as Nadia
 Lina Soualem as Meriem
 Maymouna as Louisa
 Faroudja Amazit as Madame Mouni
 Fethi Galleze as Mohamed

Production 
The film is an adaptation from Obermeyer's play of the same name, from 2009. Obermeyer first came up with the idea for the play and film in the early 1990s, following the Islamic Salvation Front (FIS) massive win in Algeria's first-ever "free and democratic" elections. As soon as the FIS took power, the party established Islamist rules against women, including dress codes, and segregation between men and women in public places (schools, hospitals, store lines, and bus stops).

According to Rayhana, as the film's director is widely known, the film is about a woman's desires in a man's world. Rayhana, who is also an actress, playwright and screenwriter, is a feminist who uses her art to protest injustice. Because of her outspokenness, her film is banned from showing in her home country of Algeria. "My movie is forbidden in my country, because I speak about women who express freely... Anyone who wears pants or shirts with half sleeves is considered a prostitute." She said that a woman who smokes is considered to have bad morals. “But smoking is for everyone, man or woman.” Rayhana herself fled Algeria in 2000, following terrorist attacks in which many of her friends were killed.

Filming 
Due to the nude scenes in the film, the production could not use a hamam in Algeria or Turkey. Instead, they chose to film in a hamam in Thessaloniki, Greece.

Reception 
The film received universal accolades, and has been screened at international film festivals around the world. According to the Hollywood Reporter's Jordan Mintzer, Smoke is a "fairly gripping account of women finding respite in each other’s company at a time, and in a place, where they have few possibilities to express themselves freely." Amal Awad, reviewing the film for Australia's SBS, called it a "thrilling tale" and "It’s a reminder of why we watch stories".

Accolades 

|-
| rowspan=2| 2016
| rowspan=2| Thessaloniki Film Festival
| Golden Alexander
| Rayhana Obermeyer
| 
| rowspan=2| 
|-
| Audience Award
| rowspan=3| I Still Hide to Smoke
| rowspan=4 
|-
| rowspan=3| 2017
| rowspan=2| Brussels Mediterranean Film Festival
| Critic's Award
| rowspan=2| 
|-
| Grand Prix
|-
| Raindance Film Festival
| Discovery Award for Best Debut Feature
| Rayhana Obermeyer
|

Further reading 
 Vincent Thabourey, "À mon âge je me cache encore pour fumer", Positif, Vol. 675, May 2017, Paris, Institut Lumière/Actes Sud, p. 53, .

References

External links 
 
 

2016 films
2016 drama films
2010s feminist films
French drama films
Greek drama films
Algerian drama films
2010s Arabic-language films
2010s French films